Salmo carpio, also known as the carpione (carpione del Garda or Lake Garda carpione) is a salmonid fish endemic to Lake Garda in Italy. It has been introduced to a number of other lakes in Italy and elsewhere but unsuccessfully in all cases. The population in Lake Garda has been strongly declining, and is considered critically endangered.
The main threats are due to overfishing, pollution and possibly competition from introduced species such as Coregonus and other Salmonidae.

Biology
Adult lake trout outside the mating season are silvery with very few black spots on the body and almost none on the head. During the mating season some males develop a dark mottled body coloration. They feed on zooplankton and bottom-dwelling crustaceans in summer. Males and females reach sexual maturity at two or three years. The mating takes place every one to two years. The maximum age for this fish is five years.

Status
The numbers of this fish in Lake Garda seem to be dwindling rapidly and had reduced by 80% in the ten years up to 2006. It is suspected that this may be because of pollution of the lake, over fishing and degradation of the lake habitat, and also the fish may face competition from introduced fish species such as Coregonus spp.. The IUCN has assessed this fish as being "Critically Endangered". A captive breeding project has been inaugurated and initial results show good production of eggs, fry and juveniles and low mortality rates. It is hoped to retain broodstock and later reintroduce fish into the lake.

References

Bibliography
 Stefano Porcellotti, Pesci d'Italia, Ittiofauna delle acque dolci Edizioni PLAN 2005; pagg. 16-17
 Zerunian S. "Condannati all'estinzione Biodiversità, biologia, minacce e strategie di conservazione dei Pesci d'acqua dolce indigeni in Italia", Edagricole 2002; pagg. 61-62

External links

 Rearing of Carpione Salmo carpio, an endemic salmonid in Lake Garda (Italy); Fernando Lunelli, Filippo Faccenda, Filippo Motta, Cristina Cappelletti and Francesca Ciutti; Fondazione Edmund Mach – Istituto Agrario di San Michele all’Adige

carpio
Fish of Europe
Endemic fauna of Italy
Fish described in 1758
Taxa named by Carl Linnaeus